

Cameroon
 Théophile Abega – Toulouse FC – 1984–85
 Gabriel Abossolo – Bordeaux – 1959–60, 1962–69
 Vincent Aboubakar – Valenciennes, Lorient – 2010–15
 Alexis Alégué – Nantes – 2015–17, 2018–19
 Nicolas Alnoudji – Bastia – 2002–03
 Paul Alo'o Efoulou – AS Nancy – 2009–13
 Benoît Angbwa – Lille – 2004–05
 Didier Angibeaud – Le Havre – 1993–94
 Benoît Assou-Ekotto – Lens, Saint-Étienne, Metz – 2003–06, 2015–18
 Jean-Hugues Ateba – Nantes, Paris SG – 2001–06
 Gustave Bahoken – Le Havre – 1999–2000
 Stéphane Bahoken – Nice, Strasbourg, Angers – 2010–13, 2017–22
Carlos Baleba – Lille – 2022–
 Albert Baning – Paris SG, Grenoble – 2006–07, 2008–09
 Jean-Landry Bassilekin – AS Nancy – 2012–13
 Sébastien Bassong – Metz – 2005–06, 2007–08
 Henri Bedimo – Toulouse FC, Lens, Montpellier, Lyon, Marseille – 2003–06, 2009–18
 Christian Bekamenga – Nantes – 2008–09
 Joseph-Antoine Bell – Marseille, Toulon, Bordeaux, Saint-Étienne – 1985–94
 Henri Bienvenu – Troyes – 2015–16
 Jean-Claude Billong – Clermont – 2021–22
 Romarin Billong – Lyon, Saint-Étienne – 1989–96, 1999–2000
 Sacha Boey – Rennes, Dijon 2018–21
 Gaëtan Bong – Metz, Valenciennes FC – 2005–06, 2007–08, 2009–14
 Pierre Boya – Grenoble – 2008–10
 Jean-Charles Castelletto – Brest, Nantes – 2019–
Aurélien Chedjou – Lille OSC, Amiens – 2007–13, 2019–20
Eric Maxim Choupo-Moting – Paris SG – 2018–20
 Eric Djemba-Djemba – Nantes – 2001–03
 Danel Dongmo – Troyes – 2022–
 Maurice Douala – AS Monaco – 1985–86
 Roudolphe Douala – Saint-Étienne – 2007–08
 Pierre Ebéde – Metz – 2007–08
 Gaspard Ebele – Montpellier – 1961–63
 Jean-Jacques Ebentsi – Le Havre – 2002–03
 Félix Eboa Eboa – Guingamp – 2017–19
Enzo Ebosse – Angers – 2020–22
 Samuel Edimo – Sochaux, Toulouse FC (1937), Red Star – 1958–60, 1961–66
 Jean-Emmanuel Effa Owona – Metz – 2007–08
 Eugène Ekéké – RC Paris – 1984–85
 Jacobert Ekoué – Alès – 1958–59
 Achille Emana – Toulouse FC – 2003–08
 Paul Essola – Bastia – 1999–2005
 Jean-Jacques Etamé – Strasbourg, Lille OSC, Caen, Cannes, Bastia – 1986–88, 1992–98
 Michel Etamé – Le Havre – 1959–60
 Ernest Etchi – Lens – 1998–99
 Henri Ewane Elong – Lille OSC – 2006–08
 Marc-Vivien Foé – Lens, Lyon – 1994–98, 2000–02
 Ignatius Ganago – Nice, Lens, Nantes – 2017–
 Thierry Gathuessi – Montpellier – 2001–04
 Jules Goda – Gazélec Ajaccio – 2015–16
 Oumar Gonzalez – Ajaccio – 2022–
 Samuel Ipoua – Nice, Toulouse FC – 1994–96, 1998–99
 Jean-Rémy Issembe – Nice – 1967–69
 Joseph-Désiré Job – Lyon, Lens, Metz, Sedan, Nice – 1996–2000, 2001–02, 2006–08
 Michel Kaham – Valenciennes – 1980–81
André Kana-Biyik – Metz, Le Havre – 1988–89, 1991–94
Jean-Armel Kana-Biyik – Le Havre, Rennes, Toulouse FC, Metz – 2008–09, 2010–16, 2021–22
Kévin Keben – Toulouse FC – 2022–
 Emmanuel Koum – AS Monaco – 1971–72, 1973–74
 Emmanuel Kundé – Laval – 1987–88
 Didier Lamkel Zé – Metz – 2021–22
 Charles Léa Eyoum – Rennes – 1974–75
 James Léa Siliki – Rennes – 2016–21
 Patrick Leugueun – Bordeaux, Istres – 2002–03, 2004–05
 Modeste M'bami – Sedan, Paris SG, Marseille – 2000–09
 Claude M'Bella N'Gom – Sochaux – 1986–87
 Grégoire M'Bida – Bastia – 1982–84
 Patrick M'Boma – Paris SG, Metz – 1994–97
 Louis-Paul M'Fédé – Rennes – 1983–84, 1985–87
 Marcel Mahouvé – Montpellier – 1997–2000
 Cyril Makanaky – Toulon, Lens – 1987–90
 Jean Makoun – Lille OSC, Lyon, Rennes – 2001–11, 2013–15
 Georges Mandjeck – Rennes, Metz – 2010–12, 2016–18
Bryan Mbeumo – Troyes – 2017–18
 Stéphane Mbia – Rennes, Marseille, Toulouse FC – 2004–13, 2018–19
 Lucien Mettomo – Saint-Étienne – 1999-2001
 Valéry Mézague – Montpellier, Sochaux – 2001–04, 2005–07, 2008–09
 Roger Milla – Valenciennes, AS Monaco, Bastia, Montpellier HSC – 1977–84, 1987–89
 Marcus Mokaké – Sedan – 2006–07
 Jacques Momha – Strasbourg – 2002–05
 Fabrice Moreau – Paris SG – 1984–87, 1988–89
 Ebenezer Moudio – Le Havre – 1959–60
Harold Moukoudi – Saint-Étienne – 2019–22
 Guillaume Moundi – Lyon – 1963–67
 Cyril N'Diba – Le Havre – 2002–03
 Pius N'Diefi – Lens, Sedan – 1993–94, 1999–2003
 Joseph N'Do – Strasbourg – 1999–2000
 Frédéric N'Doumbé – Le Havre, Montpellier, Saint-Étienne – 1959–69
 Guy N'Dy Assembé – Nantes, Valenciennes – 2008–10
 Landry N'Guémo – AS Nancy, Bordeaux – 2005–09, 2010–14
 Clinton N'Jie – Lyon, Marseille – 2012–15, 2016–19
 Eugène N'Jo Léa – Saint-Étienne, Lyon – 1954–61
 Patrick N'Tolla – AS Nancy – 2005–06
 Yvan Neyou – Saint-Étienne – 2020–22
Guy Ngosso – Angers, Amiens – 2015–16, 2017–18
Ahmad Ngouyamsa – Dijon – 2019–21
 Pierre Njanka – Strasbourg, Sedan – 1999–2003
Georges-Kévin Nkoudou – Nantes, Marseille, AS Monaco – 2013–16, 2018–19
 Nicolas Nkoulou – AS Monaco, Marseille, Lyon – 2008–17
 Zacharie Noah – Sedan – 1957–62
 Bryan Nokoue – Saint-Étienne – 2021–22
 Jean-Jacques Nono – Montpellier – 1988–91
 Dany Nounkeu – Toulouse FC, Evian – 2009–11, 2014–15
Olivier Ntcham – Marseille – 2020–21
 Paul-Georges Ntep – Rennes, Saint-Étienne – 2013–18
 Salomon Olembé – Nantes, Marseille – 1997–2007
 François Omam-Biyik – Laval, Rennes, Cannes, Marseille, Lens – 1987–89, 1990–95
 Jean Onana – Lille, Bordeaux, Lens – 2019–20, 2021–
 Ambroise Oyongo – Montpellier – 2017–22
 Jean-Claude Pagal – Lens, Saint-Étienne, Martigues – 1982–89, 1990–94
 Jean-Joël Perrier-Doumbé – Auxerre, Rennes, Toulouse FC – 2000–07, 2009–10
 Alioum Saidou – Nantes – 2006–07
Moïse Sakava – Reims – 2020–22
 Rigobert Song – Metz, Lens – 1994–98, 2002–04
 Jacques Songo'o – Toulon, Metz – 1989–92, 1993–96, 2001–02
 Kévin Soni – Bordeaux – 2015–16
 Patrick Suffo – Nantes – 1998–2000
 Adrien Tameze – Nice – 2017–20
 Bill Tchato – Montpellier, Nice – 2001–02, 2005–06
 Enzo Tchato – Montpellier – 2022–
 Karl Toko Ekambi – Angers, Lyon, Rennes – 2016–18, 2019–
 Jean-Pierre Tokoto – Marseille, Bordeaux, Paris SG – 1968–69, 1971–78
 Hervé Tum – Metz – 2004–06
 Franklin Wadja – Lorient – 2020–21
 Christopher Wooh – Lens, Rennes – 2021–
 Banana Yaya – Sochaux – 2011–13
 Joseph Yegba Maya – Marseille, Valenciennes, Strasbourg – 1962–63, 1966–71, 1972–75
 Darlin Yongwa – Lorient – 2022–
 Wilitty Younoussa – Dijon – 2020–21
 André-Frank Zambo Anguissa – Marseille – 2015–18
 Jacques Zoua – Gazélec Ajaccio – 2015–16

Canada
Jonathan David – Lille – 2020–
Ostap Steckiw – Nice – 1948–50
Iké Ugbo – Troyes – 2021–

Cape Verde
 Jerson Cabral – SC Bastia – 2016–17
 Logan Costa – Toulouse FC – 2022–
 Nuno da Costa – Strasbourg, Auxerre – 2017–20, 2022–
 Odair Fortes – Reims – 2012–16
 Steven Fortès – Toulouse FC, Lens – 2017–19, 2020–
 Vagner Gonçalves – Saint-Étienne, Metz – 2017–18, 2020–22
 Ryan Mendes – Le Havre, Lille – 2008–09, 2012–15
 Erin Pinheiro – Saint-Étienne – 2015–16
 Kenny Rocha Santos – Saint-Étienne – 2016–19
 Júlio Tavares – Dijon – 2016–20

Central African Republic
 Franklin Anzité – AC Ajaccio – 2005–06
 Eloge Enza Yamissi – Troyes – 2005–07, 2012–13
 Habib Habibou – Rennes – 2014–16
Geoffrey Kondogbia – Lens, Monaco – 2010–11, 2013–15
Louis Mafouta – Metz – 2021–22
 Frédéric Nimani – Monaco, Lorient – 2006–10
 Cédric Yambéré – Bordeaux, Dijon – 2014–16, 2017–19
 Amos Youga – Gazélec Ajaccio – 2015–16

Chad
 Japhet N'Doram – Nantes, Monaco – 1990–98
 Casimir Ninga – Montpellier, Caen, Angers – 2015–22
 Al Habo Senoussi – Nice, Rennes – 1987–88, 1990–92
 Nambatingue Toko – Nice, Bordeaux, Strasbourg, Valenciennes, Paris SG – 1975–85

Chile
 Pablo Contreras – Monaco – 1999–2001
 Marco Estrada – Montpellier – 2010–13
 Alberto Fouillioux – Lille – 1974–75
 Mauricio Isla – Marseille – 2015–16
 Juan Gonzalo Lorca – Boulogne – 2009–10
 Guillermo Maripán – Monaco – 2019–
 Ignacio Prieto – Lille, Laval – 1971–72, 1974–77
 Pedro Reyes – Auxerre – 1998-01
 Fernando Riera – Reims – 1950–51
Alexis Sánchez – Marseille – 2022–
Gabriel Suazo – Toulouse – 2022–
 Héctor Tapia – Lille – 2003–04

China
 Li Jinyu – AS Nancy – 1998–99

Colombia
 Abel Aguilar – Toulouse FC – 2013–16
 Víctor Bonilla – Toulouse FC, Nantes, Montpellier – 2000–03
 Edwin Congo – Toulouse FC – 2000–01
 Jhon Culma – Brest – 2011–13
 Andrés Ramiro Escobar – Evian – 2013–14
 Radamel Falcao – AS Monaco – 2013–14, 2016–19
 Fredy Guarín – Saint-Étienne – 2006–08
 Deiver Machado – Lens – 2021–
 Stiven Mendoza – Amiens – 2017–20
 Faryd Aly Mondragón – Metz – 2000–01
 Victor Hugo Montaño – Istres, Montpellier, Rennes, Montpellier – 2004–05, 2009–14
Marlos Moreno – Troyes – 2022–
 Tressor Moreno – Metz – 2000–02, 2003–04
 Felipe Pardo – FC Nantes – 2016–17
 David Ospina – Nice – 2008–14
 Juan Ferney Otero – Amiens – 2018–20
 Brayan Perea – Troyes – 2015–16
 Edixon Perea Valencia – Bordeaux – 2005–07
 Juan Pablo Pino – AS Monaco – 2006–10
 Juan Fernando Quintero – Rennes – 2015–16
 Wason Rentería – Strasbourg – 2007–08
 James Rodríguez – AS Monaco – 2013–14
 Joao Rodríguez – Bastia – 2014–15
 Carlos Sánchez Moreno – Valenciennes – 2007–13
 Luis Suárez – Marseille – 2022–
 Carlos Valderrama – Montpellier – 1988–91
 Alexander Viveros – Nantes – 2004–05
 Luis Yanes – Lille OSC – 2007–08
 Mario Yepes – Nantes, Paris SG – 2001–08

Comoros
Kassim Abdallah – Marseille, Evian – 2012–15
Jimmy Abdou – Sedan – 2006–07
Rafidine Abdullah – Marseille, Lorient – 2012–16
Ali Ahamada – Toulouse – 2010–16
Chaker Alhadhur – Nantes, Caen, Ajaccio – 2013–16, 2022–
Djamel Bakar – Monaco, Nancy, Montpellier – 2006–16
El Fardou Ben Nabouhane – Le Havre – 2008–09
Kemal Bourhani – Guingamp, Lorient – 2001-02, 2003–04, 2006–08
Youssouf M'Changama – AJ Auxerre – 2022–
Ali M'Madi – Evian – 2011–13
Fouad Rachid – Nancy – 2010–13
Rafiki Saïd – Brest – 2021–22
Faïz Selemani – Lorient – 2016–17
Mohamed Youssouf – Le Havre, Ajaccio – 2008–09, 2022–
Younn Zahary – Caen – 2018–19

Congo
 Lucien Aubey – Toulouse FC, Lens, Rennes – 2003–10
 Durel Avounou – Caen – 2017–18
 Tobias Badila – Nancy – 2016–17
Dylan Bahamboula – Dijon – 2016–18
 Jean Baleckita – Ajaccio – 1969–70
 Valentin Bamana – RC Paris – 1957–58
 Christian Bassila – Lyon, Rennes, Strasbourg – 1996–01, 2002–06
 Thievy Bifouma – Reims, Bastia – 2015–17
 Alexis Bob – Limoges – 1958–61
 Arnold Bouka Moutou – Angers, Dijon – 2015–19
 Férébory Doré – Angers – 2015–17
 Ladislas Douniama – Lorient, Guingamp – 2011–12, 2013–2015
 Albin Ebondo – Toulouse FC, Saint-Étienne – 2003–12
 Oscar Ewolo – Lorient, Brest – 2006–09, 2010–12
 Jean-Jacques Ikonga – Marseille – 1958–59
 Kevin Koubemba – Lille – 2014–15
 Amine Linganzi – Saint-Étienne – 2007–08
 François M'Pelé – Ajaccio, Paris SG, Lens – 1968–73, 1974–81
 Christopher Maboulou – Bastia – 2014–16
 Béni Makouana – Montpellier – 2021–
 Chris Malonga – Nancy, Monaco – 2007–11
 André Malouema – Sochaux – 1964–67
 Michel Massemba – Bastia – 1982–83
 Fernand Mayembo – Ajaccio – 2022–
 Nolan Mbemba – Lille, Reims – 2015–16, 2018–19
 Christopher Missilou – Ajaccio – 2011–12
 Paul Moukila – Strasbourg – 1975–76
 Barel Mouko – Lille – 2012–13
 Matt Moussilou – Lille OSC, Lens, Nice, Saint-Étienne, Marseille, Boulogne – 2001–08, 2009–10
 Bevic Moussiti-Oko – Ajaccio – 2022–23
 Delvin N'Dinga – Auxerre, Monaco  – 2008–14
 Francis N'Ganga – Grenoble – 2008–09
 Exaucé Ngassaki – Caen – 2016–17
 Prince Oniangué – Rennes, Reims, Bastia, Angers, Caen – 2008–09, 2013–16, 2017–19
 Bryan Passi – Montpellier – 2016–17
 Morgan Poaty – Montpellier – 2016–18
 Dylan Saint-Louis – Saint-Étienne – 2016–17
 Jean-François Samba – Cannes – 1987–89
 Jules Tchimbakala – Toulouse FC – 1997–98
Warren Tchimbembé – Metz – 2020–22

Costa Rica
 Joel Campbell – Lorient – 2011–12
 Keylor Navas – Paris SG – 2019–
 David Ramírez – Evian – 2014–15
 John Jairo Ruiz – Lille – 2013–14
 Yeltsin Tejeda – Evian – 2014–15

Côte d'Ivoire
Samassi Abou – Lyon, Cannes – 1992–98
Emmanuel Agbadou – Reims – 2022–
Jean-Eudes Aholou – Strasbourg, Monaco, Saint-Étienne – 2017–
Kanga Akalé – Auxerre, Lens, Marseille – 2002–08, 2009–11
Benjamin Akouaté – Metz – 1961–62
Victorien Angban – Metz – 2019–21
Benjamin Angoua – Valenciennes, Guingamp – 2009–17
Roger Assalé – Dijon – 2020–21
Serge Aurier – Toulouse, Paris SG – 2012–17
Georges Ba – Nice, Troyes – 2003–04, 2005–07
Lionel Bah – Guingamp – 2002–04
Eric Bailly – Marseille – 2022–
Dagui Bakari – Lille, Lens, Nancy – 2000–06
Ibrahima Bakayoko – Montpellier, Marseille, Istres – 1995–98, 1999–2002, 2004–05
Abdoulaye Bamba – Dijon, Angers – 2011–12, 2016–
Souleymane Bamba – Paris SG – 2004–05
Joseph Bleziri – Bastia – 1968–70
Jérémie Boga – Rennes – 2015–16
Arthur Boka – Strasbourg – 2004–06
Yannick Boli – Paris SG, Le Havre – 2007–09
Willy Boly – Auxerre – 2010–12
Abou Cissé – Nîmes – 1991–92
Faustin Coffie – Limoges – 1958–59
Maxwel Cornet – Lyon – 2015–21
Kafoumba Coulibaly – Nice – 2008–10
Kouadio-Yves Dabila – Lille – 2017–19
Eugène Dadi – Toulouse – 2000–01
Joseph Damai – Saint-Étienne – 1958–60
Issoumaila Dao – Toulouse – 2003–08
Lassina Diabaté – Bordeaux, Auxerre, Ajaccio – 1997–2002, 2003–04
Zié Diabaté – Dijon – 2011–12
Sékana Diaby – RC Paris, Laval, Brest – 1987–91
Hamed Mobido Diallo – Le Havre – 1997–98, 1999–2000
Ismaël Diallo – Ajaccio – 2022–
Amara Diané – Strasbourg, Paris SG – 2005–08
Stéphane Diarra – Lorient – 2020–
Serge Dié – Nice, Metz – 2002–05
Boris Diecket – Angers, Tours, Nantes – 1979–81, 1984–85, 1988–89
Aruna Dindane – Lens – 2005–08
Ismaël Diomandé – Saint-Étienne, Caen – 2011–19
Sinaly Diomandé – Lyon – 2020–
Franck Dja Djedje – Paris SG, Grenoble, Arles-Avignon, Nice – 2003–04, 2005–06, 2008–09, 2010–11
Koffi Djidji – Nantes – 2013–19
Cyril Domoraud – Marseille, Bastia, Monaco – 1997–99, 2000–02
Jean-Jacques Domoraud – Sochaux, Le Mans – 2002–04
Cheick Doukouré – Lorient, Metz – 2010–11, 2013–15, 2016–17
Souleyman Doumbia – Rennes, Angers – 2018–
Didier Drogba – Guingamp, Marseille – 2002–04
Emerse Faé – Nantes, Nice – 2003–07, 2008–12
Moryké Fofana – Lorient – 2015–17
Seko Fofana – Bastia, Lens – 2015–16, 2020–
Youssouf Falikou Fofana – Monaco, Bordeaux – 1985–95
Jean-Philippe Gbamin – Bastia – 2014–15
Gervinho – Le Mans, Lille – 2007–11
Joris Gnagnon – Rennes – 2015–18
Gérard Gnanhouan – Guingamp, Sochaux – 2001–05
Michel Goba – Brest – 1982–83
Jean-Jacques Gosso – Monaco – 2008–10
Alain Gouaméné – Toulouse – 1997–99
Max-Alain Gradel – Saint-Étienne, Toulouse – 2011–15, 2017–20
Jean-Michel Guédé – Montpellier, Laval – 1987–89
Marc-Éric Gueï – Montpellier – 1998–99
Tchiressoua Guel – Marseille, Saint-Étienne, Lorient – 1998–2002
Bonaventure Kalou – Auxerre, Paris SG, Lens – 2003–08
Hassane Kamara – Reims, Nice – 2015–16, 2018–22
Wilfried Kanga – Angers – 2017–20
Lossémy Karaboué – Nancy, Troyes – 2011–13, 2015–16
Benjamin Karamoko – Saint-Étienne – 2014–15, 2016–18
Ambroise Lohou Kédié – Brest – 1979–80, 1981–83
Abdul Kader Keita – Lille, Lyon – 2005–09
N'Dri Philippe Koffi – Reims – 2021–
Ghislain Konan – Reims – 2018–22
Bakari Koné – Nice, Marseille – 2005–10
Ibrahim Koné – Boulogne – 2009–10
Lamine Koné – Lorient, Strasbourg – 2010–16, 2018–21
Augustin Kouadjio – Metz – 1961–62, 1967–68
Christian Kouakou – Caen – 2015–16, 2017–18
Blaise Kouassi – Guingamp, Troyes – 2000–04, 2005–07
Aimé Koudou – Sochaux – 1994–95
Jean-Philippe Krasso – Saint-Étienne – 2020–22
Élie Kroupi – Rennes, Lorient, Nancy – 1997–98, 2001–02, 2005–06
Saliou Lassissi – Rennes – 1996–98
Serge-Alain Liri – Sedan – 2002–03
Igor Lolo – Monaco – 2008–11
Edgar Loué – Strasbourg – 2005–06
Habib Maïga – Saint-Étienne, Metz – 2017–18, 2019–22
Abdoulaye Méïté – Marseille – 2000–06
 Bamo Meïté – Lorient – 2022–
Yakou Méïte – Paris SG – 2015–16
Serge N'Guessan – Nancy – 2016–17
Didier Otokoré – Auxerre, Sochaux, Cannes – 1987–94
Mama Ouattara – Nîmes, Montpellier – 1972–74, 1981–82
Nicolas Pépé – Angers, Lille, Nice – 2016–19, 2022–
Laurent Pokou – Rennes, Nancy – 1974–75, 1976–79
Romaric – Le Mans, Bastia – 2005–08, 2013–15
Yannick Sagbo – Monaco, Evian – 2008–13
Ibrahim Sangaré – Toulouse – 2016–20
Boubacar Sanogo – Saint-Étienne – 2009–12
Jean Michaël Seri – Nice, Bordeaux – 2015–18, 2020–21
Donald-Olivier Sié – Toulouse – 1998–99
Jean-Désiré Sikely – Marseille, Montpellier – 1973–75, 1978–79, 1981–82
Ibrahim Sissoko – Saint-Étienne – 2013–14
Bakary Soro – Lorient, Arles-Avignon – 2008–09, 2010–11
Junior Tallo – Ajaccio, Bastia, Lille – 2013–17
Olivier Tébily – Châteauroux – 1997–98
Joël Tiéhi – Le Havre, Lens, Martigues, Toulouse FC – 1987–88, 1991–98
Siaka Tiéné – Saint-Étienne, Valenciennes, Paris SG, Montpellier – 2005–06, 2007–15
Cheick Timité – Amiens – 2018–20
Jean Tokpa – Alès, RC Paris – 1957–64
Sékou Touré – Alès, Sochaux, Montpellier, Grenoble, Nice, Nîmes – 1958–64
Thomas Touré – Bordeaux, Angers – 2013–18
Venn Touré – Metz – 2004–05
Yaya Touré – Monaco – 2006–07
Abdoulaye Traoré – Toulon – 1988–89
Ismaël Traoré – Brest, Angers – 2012–13, 2015–22
Kandia Traoré – Sochaux, Caen – 2007–09, 2010–12
Lacina Traoré – Monaco, Amiens – 2014–16, 2017–18
Moussa Traoré – Rennes – 1990–91
Ignace Wotchin Otchonou – Angers, Lens – 1957–63
Gilles Yapi Yapo – Nantes – 2003–05
François Zahoui – Nancy, Toulon – 1983–92
Patrice Zéré – Lens – 1988–89
Didier Zokora – Saint-Étienne – 2004–06

Croatia
 Stjepan Andrijaševic – Monaco – 1992–93
 Aljoša Asanović – Metz, Cannes, Montpellier – 1990–94
Toma Bašić – Bordeaux – 2018–22
 Alen Bokšić – Cannes, Marseille – 1991–93
 Domagoj Bradarić – Lille – 2019–22
 Duje Ćaleta-Car – Marseille – 2018–22
 Milan Čop – Nancy – 1970–71
 Nikica Cukrov – Toulon – 1985–86
 Damjan Đoković – Gazélec Ajaccio – 2015–16
 Salih Durkalić – Sochaux – 1979–81
 Ivo Grbić – Lille – 2021–22
 Ivan Hlevnjak – Strasbourg – 1973–75
 Marin Jakoliš – Angers – 2021–
 Hrvoje Jukić – Valenciennes – 1967–68
Lovre Kalinić – Toulouse FC – 2019–20
 Ivan Klasnić – Nantes – 2008–09
 Zdenko Kobeščak – Rennes – 1971–72
 Slavko Kodrnja – Antibes – 1938–39
 Ardian Kozniku – Cannes, Le Havre – 1994–97
 Jerko Leko – Monaco – 2006–10
 Ivica Liposinović – Bordeaux – 1971–74
 Dejan Lovren  – Lyon – 2009–13, 2022–
 Šime Luketin – Sochaux – 1981–82
 Lovro Majer – Rennes – 2021–
 Antonio Mance – Nantes – 2018–19
 Marko Marić – Lille – 2007–09
 Vladimir Mataušić – Strasbourg, Red Star – 1967–68, 1969–70
 Branko Milanović – Le Havre – 1961–62
 Marko Mlinarić – Auxerre, Cannes – 1987–91
 Ivica Mornar – Rennes – 2004–05
Ante Palaversa – Troyes – 2022–
 Ivan Pavlica – Metz – 1972–73
 Mateo Pavlović – Angers – 2016–21
 Mario Pašalić – Monaco – 2015–16
 Nikola Perlić – Fives – 1937–38
 Saša Peršon – Cannes – 1995–97
 Ivan Petrak – Sète, Cannes, Excelsior Roubaix – 1936–39
 Vladimir Petrović – Toulouse FC – 1998–2000
 Nikola Pokrivač – Monaco – 2007–09
 Dado Pršo – Monaco – 1999–04
 Krasnodar Rora – Nancy – 1975–77
 Goran Rubil – Nantes – 1999–05
 Vedran Runje  – Marseille, Lens – 2001–04, 2007–08, 2009–11
Ivan Santini – Caen – 2016–18
 Kujtim Shala – Rennes – 1991–92
 Dario Šimić – Monaco – 2008–09
 Josip Skoblar – Marseille – 1966–67, 1969–74
 Robert Špehar – Monaco – 1997–99
Danijel Subašić – Monaco – 2013–20
 Ivan Šuprina – Strasbourg – 1947–48
 Ivica Šurjak – Paris SG – 1981–82
 Josip Tadić – Grenoble – 2009–10
 Branko Tucak – Metz, Nancy – 1981–84
 Drago Vabec – Brest – 1979–80, 1981–83
 Zlatko Vujović – Bordeaux, Cannes, Paris SG, Sochaux – 1986–92
 Zoran Vujović – Bordeaux, Cannes – 1986–89, 1991–92
 Zoran Vulić – Nantes – 1991–93
 Aleksandar Živkovic – RC Paris, Sochaux – 1935–39

Cyprus
Valentin Roberge – Reims – 2014–15

Czech Republic
 Václav Bára – Fives – 1933–36
 Milan Baroš – Lyon – 2007–08
 Radek Bejbl – Lens – 2000–02
 Frantisek Benes – Antibes – 1932–33
 René Bolf – Auxerre – 2004–06
 Jaroslav Boucek – Rennes – 1932–33
 Václav Bouška – Olympique Lillois – 1934–35
 Václav Brabec – Alès – 1934–35
 Vojtech Bradác – Sochaux – 1936–37
 Otto Bures – Marseille, Cannes – 1946–49
 Antonín Carvan – SC Nîmes – 1932–34
 Petr Čech – Rennes – 2002–04
 Jaroslav Červený – SC Nîmes – 1934–35
 Maximilian Cyfka – Fives – 1932–33
 Václav Danek – Le Havre – 1991–92
 Václav Drobný – Strasbourg – 2002–04
 Ludwig Dupal – Sochaux – 1947–48
 Jan Fiala – Le Havre – 1987–88
 Karel Finek – Saint-Étienne – 1946–48
 Pavel Fort – Toulouse – 2006–07
 Jirí Hanke – Lens – 1951–52
 Ivan Hašek – Strasbourg – 1992–94
 Marek Heinz – Saint-Étienne – 2006–07
 Karel Hes – Metz, Saint-Étienne – 1936–39
 Joseph Humpal – Sochaux, Strasbourg – 1947–51, 1953–55
 Miroslav Jankowski – Saint-Étienne – 1947–49
 Lukáš Jarolím – Sedan – 2002–03
 David Kobylík – Strasbourg – 2002–04
 Jan Kolaric – Alès – 1947–48
 Jan Koller – Monaco – 2006–08
 Frantisek Kolman – Cannes – 1947–48
 Vilém König  – Marseille – 1934–35
 Pavel Kouba – Angoulême – 1969–72
 Tomáš Koubek – Rennes – 2017–19
 Luboš Kubík – Metz – 1991–93
 František Kuchta – SC Nîmes – 1933–35
 Karel Kudrna – Montpellier – 1932–35
 Mario Licka – Brest – 2010–13
 Karel Michlowsky – Sochaux, Saint-Étienne – 1947–48, 1949–51
 Tomáš Mičola – Brest – 2010–12
 Antonín Moudrý – Montpellier – 1933–35
 Václav Mrázek – Rennes – 1932–33
 Jozef Navra – Rennes – 1945–46
 Václav Nemecek – Toulouse – 1992–94
 Jaroslav Plašil – Monaco, Bordeaux – 2001–08, 2009–13, 2014–19
 Lukáš Pokorný – Montpellier – 2016–17
 Tomáš Pospíchal – Rouen – 1968–70
 Vlastimil Preis – Cannes – 1947–48
 Vladar Prosek – Rennes – 1932–33
 Jaroslav Repka – Alès – 1947–48
 Milan Roeder – Lille – 1947–48
 David Rozehnal – Paris SG, Lille – 2005–07, 2010–15
 Georges Sefelin – Rennes, Fives, Sochaux – 1932–37, 1938–39
 Josef Silný – SC Nîmes – 1933–35
 Rudolf Skácel – Marseille – 2003–04
 Vladimír Šmicer – Lens, Bordeaux – 1996–99, 2005–07
 Vladimir Steigl – Rennes – 1946–47
 Jan Suchopárek – Strasbourg – 1996–99
 Václav Svěrkoš – Sochaux – 2008–11
 Ottokar Sykora – Sochaux – 1947–49
 Antonin Tichy – Sochaux, Lyon – 1947–50, 1951–52
 Štepán Vachoušek – Marseille – 2003–04
 Ladislav Vízek – Le Havre – 1986–88
 Jaroslav Vojta – Rennes – 1932–33
 Miroslav Vratil – Marseille – 1947–48

References and notes

Books

Club pages
AJ Auxerre former players
AJ Auxerre former players
Girondins de Bordeaux former players
Girondins de Bordeaux former players
Les ex-Tangos (joueurs), Stade Lavallois former players
Olympique Lyonnais former players
Olympique de Marseille former players
FC Metz former players
AS Monaco FC former players
Ils ont porté les couleurs de la Paillade... Montpellier HSC Former players
AS Nancy former players
FC Nantes former players
Paris SG former players
Red Star Former players
Red Star former players
Stade de Reims former players
Stade Rennais former players
CO Roubaix-Tourcoing former players
AS Saint-Étienne former players
Sporting Toulon Var former players

Others
stat2foot
footballenfrance
French Clubs' Players in European Cups 1955-1995, RSSSF
Finnish players abroad, RSSSF
Italian players abroad, RSSSF
Romanians who played in foreign championships
Swiss players in France, RSSSF
EURO 2008 CONNECTIONS: FRANCE, Stephen Byrne Bristol Rovers official site

Notes

Notes

France
 
Association football player non-biographical articles